Dark Horse Records is a record label founded by former Beatle George Harrison in 1974. The label's formation coincided with the winding down of the Beatles' Apple Records and allowed Harrison to continue supporting other artists' projects while maintaining his solo career. The initial signings were Indian musician Ravi Shankar and Splinter, the latter of whom provided the label with its only significant commercial success until Harrison himself signed with Dark Horse in 1976. The label was distributed internationally by A&M Records for the first two years of its operation. Following a highly publicised split with A&M, Harrison and Dark Horse formed a long-term partnership with Warner Bros. Records that lasted until the expiration of his contract in 1994.

Attitudes, Stairsteps and Keni Burke were among the other artists who recorded for Dark Horse, although it increasingly became a vehicle for Harrison's solo releases once Warner's had taken over distribution. After a ten-year period of inactivity, the label returned in 2002 with the posthumous release of Harrison's final studio album, Brainwashed, followed by his Dark Horse Years box set in 2004. Dark Horse Records also issued the Shankar–Harrison compilation box set Collaborations in 2010.

In March 2021, the record label released Assembly, a new remastered collection of Joe Strummer's solo work.

Background

Since the formation of the Beatles' EMI-affiliated Apple Records in 1968, George Harrison had produced and helped nurture acts signed to the label, including Jackie Lomax, Billy Preston and Badfinger, all of whom were little known at the time. Following the Beatles' break-up in 1970, Harrison continued in this role while maintaining a successful solo career, adding prestigious signings such as Ravi Shankar and Ronnie Spector to Apple's roster. By 1973, when he was producing an ambitious "East-meets-West" album by Shankar and the debut by a duo from South Shields, Splinter, Apple was being wound down following Harrison, John Lennon and Ringo Starr severing their ties with Beatles manager Allen Klein. While all the former Beatles were contractually obliged to EMI until 26 January 1976, as solo artists, Harrison sought a new avenue for his extracurricular projects. He and Starr considered buying Apple in 1973 and running it themselves, but Harrison was wary of business complications associated with the label.

In early 1974, he began a dialogue with David Geffen, head of Asylum Records in Los Angeles, and, according to Tom Petty's later recollection, he also consulted Leon Russell, co-founder of Shelter Records, about setting up a label. Harrison eventually agreed terms with A&M Records for the latter to distribute his new label worldwide. For a company name, Harrison used the title of a song he had written in 1973, "Dark Horse". The inspiration for the Dark Horse Records logo came from a label on a tin that Harrison found during a trip to India. The logo features the seven-headed horse Uchchaisravas, a common figure in Indian art and mythology.

History
After Harrison signed with Dark Horse Records on 27 January 1976, all of his subsequent recordings were released through the label, starting with that year's Thirty Three & 1/3 and ending with Live in Japan in 1992. After the latter, it went into hiatus for ten years.

Dark Horse was distributed by A&M Records (1974–76), Warner Bros. Records (1976–94) and EMI (2002–04).

Dark Horse was revived with the posthumous release of Brainwashed in 2002. Harrison's back catalogue on the label was remastered and reissued as the Dark Horse Years 1976–1992 box set during 2004. In 2010, Dark Horse released the Ravi Shankar–George Harrison box set Collaborations, with distribution through Rhino Entertainment.

In 2017 all original Apple and Dark Horse Records albums were reissued and distributed by Universal Music Group.

On 22 January 2020, Dark Horse signed a distribution deal with BMG Rights Management. The deal marked the label's revival by Harrison's son Dhani, who announced that it had acquired Joe Strummer's catalogue.

Artists
Though Dark Horse ultimately focused solely on Harrison's releases, the label also released albums by the following artists between 1974 and 1978:
Ravi Shankar
Attitudes, a Los Angeles band
Splinter, a South Shields duo
The Stairsteps, a Chicago soul vocal group
R&B vocalist Keni Burke, a former member of the Stairsteps
Henry McCullough, formerly guitarist with Joe Cocker and Wings
Jiva, a California band

Discography
Singles

Albums

Notes
 Also released as a picture disc, catalog number K 17423P
 Released by Dark Horse/Parlophone.
 Box set of Harrison's remastered Dark Horse years albums: Thirty Three & 1/3 (1977) to Cloud Nine (1987).
 Box set consisting of Shankar's two Harrison-produced albums on Dark Horse – Ravi Shankar's Music Festival from India and Shankar Family & Friends – together with Chants of India (1997) and a DVD containing film of a 1974 Musical Festival from India performance at the Royal Albert Hall, London.

See also
 List of record labels
 George Harrison discography

References

Sources

 Keith Badman, The Beatles Diary Volume 2: After the Break-Up 1970–2001, Omnibus Press (London, 2001).
 Alan Clayson, George Harrison, Sanctuary (London, 2003).
 Peter Doggett, You Never Give Me Your Money: The Beatles After the Breakup, It Books (New York, NY, 2011).
 The Editors of Rolling Stone, Harrison, Rolling Stone Press/Simon & Schuster (New York, NY, 2002).
 Chris Hunt (ed.), NME Originals: Beatles – The Solo Years 1970–1980, IPC Ignite! (London, 2005).
 Ian Inglis, The Words and Music of George Harrison, Praeger (Santa Barbara, CA, 2010).
 Peter Lavezzoli, The Dawn of Indian Music in the West, Continuum (New York, NY, 2006).
 Simon Leng, While My Guitar Gently Weeps: The Music of George Harrison, Hal Leonard (Milwaukee, WI, 2006).
 Chip Madinger & Mark Easter, Eight Arms to Hold You: The Solo Beatles Compendium, 44.1 Productions (Chesterfield, MO, 2000).
 Robert Rodriguez, Fab Four FAQ 2.0: The Beatles' Solo Years, 1970–1980, Backbeat Books (Milwaukee, WI, 2010).
 Bruce Spizer, The Beatles Solo on Apple Records, 498 Productions (New Orleans, LA, 2005).
 Gary Tillery, Working Class Mystic: A Spiritual Biography of George Harrison, Quest Books (Wheaton, IL, 2011).
 Bob Woffinden, The Beatles Apart, Proteus (London, 1981).

External links
 George Harrison

 
British record labels
Vanity record labels
George Harrison
 
Record labels established in 1974
Record labels disestablished in 1992
Record labels established in 2002
Record labels disestablished in 2004
Re-established companies
2002 establishments in the United Kingdom